Hope Historic District is a  national historic district located at Hope, Bartholomew County, Indiana.  It encompasses 205 contributing buildings, four contributing sites and two contributing objects in the central business district and surrounding residential areas of Hope. It was developed between about 1840 and 1940, includes works by architect Elmer E. Dunlap and by L.W. Weisner, and notable examples of Greek Revival, Italianate, Hall and parlor, and other architecture.  Notable buildings include the Moravian Church (1875) and old parsonage (1875), City School (1906), Baptist Church, Methodist Episcopal Church (1887), Alfred Sanford Rominger House (c. 1840), Frank Stapp House (c. 1890), Masonic Temple (1910), and E.B. Spaugh Building (1915).

It was listed on the National Register of Historic Places in 1991.

References

External links

Historic districts on the National Register of Historic Places in Indiana
Greek Revival architecture in Indiana
Italianate architecture in Indiana
Geography of Bartholomew County, Indiana
National Register of Historic Places in Bartholomew County, Indiana